Agnes E. Jacomb, pseud: Agnes Elizabeth Jacomb-Hood (1866 – 1949) was an English novelist, born in London. She began her literary career by winning the 250-guinea prize in the Melrose First Novel Competition with The Faith of His Fathers: A Story of Some Idealists (1909). The novel was a commercial as well as a literary success.  Her other novels include Johnny Lewison (1909), The Lonely Road (1911), Esther (1912) and The Fruits of the Morrow (1914).

References 

1866 births
1949 deaths
Writers from London
20th-century English novelists
English women novelists
20th-century English women writers